Oswald Rathmann (21 July 1891 – 22 September 1936) was a German road racing cyclist who competed in the 1912 Summer Olympics. He was born in Glatz. In 1912 he was a member of the German cycling team which finished sixth in the team time trial event. In the individual time trial competition he finished 33rd.

References

1891 births
1936 deaths
German male cyclists
Olympic cyclists of Germany
Cyclists at the 1912 Summer Olympics
People from Kłodzko
People from the Province of Silesia